is a Japanese anime series produced from 2001 to 2003 by OLM, Inc. Kasumin tells the story of Kasumi Haruno (Misty Springfield), the protagonist, and the family she lives with, the Kasumis (Mistins) who are from a race of creatures called Henamon. The show first aired on NHK on October 13, 2001, and ended on October 1, 2003. An English dub of the series renamed "Mistin" supposedly aired in 2001 in South-East Asia.

References

External links

2001 anime television series debuts
Japanese children's animated comedy television series
OLM, Inc.
NHK original programming
Anime with original screenplays